Dendrolirium ferrugineum, synonym Eria ferruginea, is a species of orchid. It is native to Bhutan and Assam in the eastern Himalayas.

References

Eriinae
Flora of Assam (region)
Flora of Bhutan
Orchids of Asia
Plants described in 1839